Clarksville is a town in Mecklenburg county in the U.S. state of Virginia, near the southern border of the commonwealth. The population was 1,139 at the 2010 census. Since the town has numerous buildings of the 18th-, 19th-, and early 20th-century architecture, the downtown area of Clarksville has been designated a Historic District on the National Register of Historic Places and Virginia's Historic Register. Clarksville claims the title of Virginia's only Lakeside town. Nearby the town of Clarksville is Occoneechee State Park.

The town is located on Kerr Lake, which is also known as Buggs Island Lake. The  lake is popular for boating and fishing; especially for catfish and many varieties of freshwater bass including largemouth bass, striped bass and crappie.

The Virginia Lake Festival is held annually at Clarksville during the third weekend of July. The town often attracts approximately 80,000 visitors during this three-day event, formerly and colloquially known as "Lakefest".  It culminates with a fireworks show on the lake.

The festival has been named among the "Top Twenty Festivals In The Southeast" by the Southeast Tourism Society for many years.

Geography
Clarksville is located at  (36.622171, -78.562230).

According to the United States Census Bureau, the town has a total area of 2.0 square miles (5.2 km2), of which 2.0 square miles (5.1 km2) is land and 0.04 square mile (0.1 km2) (1.49%) is water.

Clarksville is located roughly 60 miles north of Raleigh, North Carolina and roughly 90 miles southwest of Richmond.

History
Located along the Roanoke River, these lands were for centuries the home to the Occaneechi Native Americans.  They controlled the junction of several trading paths in the area. The Eno-Occoneechee tribe are directly descendants of the original Occoneechees and currently reside in nearby Vance County, North Carolina.

Clarksville was the first incorporated town in the county of Mecklenburg. In 1818, the town was named after its founder, Clark Royster.  Settlers populated the area quickly because of the temperate climate and the fine tobacco soil.

By 1832, Clarksville was recognized as one of the fastest-growing towns in Virginia. The Clarksville Tobacco Market was so large and important that the Roanoke Navigation Company was formed to transport the crop by way of the Roanoke River to Petersburg, a major export town, and other areas. In years to follow, the Roanoke Valley Railroad was built from Clarksville to Manson, North Carolina.

By 1848, Clarksville was known as a major market for leaf tobacco and a tobacco-manufacturing center. Large shipments of tobacco were exported to Europe. In 1860, R. H. Moss and Brothers Factory in Clarksville was producing more manufactured tobacco than any other establishment in Virginia or the Carolinas. To date, Clarksville proudly claims the title of the oldest continuous tobacco market in the world.

The Clarksville Historic District, Cedar Grove, Prestwould, Clark Royster House, Sunnyside, Patrick Robert Sydnor Log Cabin, and Judge Henry Wood, Jr. House are listed on the National Register of Historic Places.

Demographics

As of the census of 2010, there were 1,139 people, 641 households, and 380 families residing in the town. The population density was 671.5 people per square mile (259.2/km2). There were 753 housing units at an average density of 380.5 per square mile (146.8/km2). The racial makeup of the town was 71.18% White, 26.79% African American, 0.38% Native American, 0.38% Asian, 0.08% from other races, and 1.20% from two or more races. Hispanic or Latino of any race were 0.53% of the population.

There were 641 households, out of which 21.8% had children under the age of 18 living with them, 45.1% were married couples living together, 11.2% had a female householder with no husband present, and 40.7% were non-families. 37.6% of all households were made up of individuals, and 20.4% had someone living alone who was 65 years of age or older. The average household size was 2.07 and the average family size was 2.71.

In the town, the population was spread out, with 20.2% under the age of 18, 5.6% from 18 to 24, 23.9% from 25 to 44, 25.1% from 45 to 64, and 25.3% who were 65 years of age or older. The median age was 45 years. For every 100 females there were 77.4 males. For every 100 females age 18 and over, there were 75.2 males.

The median income for a household in the town was $33,063, and the median income for a family was $39,625. Males had a median income of $30,556 versus $17,375 for females. The per capita income for the town was $20,546. About 6.4% of families and 9.8% of the population were below the poverty line, including 13.8% of those under age 18 and 10.0% of those age 65 or over.

Notable people 

J. Hartwell Harrison, M.D., was instrumental in the world's first kidney transplant
 Jerome Kersey, pro basketball player

Climate
The climate in this area is characterized by hot, humid summers and generally mild to cool winters.  According to the Köppen Climate Classification system, Clarksville has a humid subtropical climate, abbreviated "Cfa" on climate maps.

Notes

References

Further reading

External links

 Government
 
 
 General information
 Clarksville Lake Country Chamber of Commerce
 

1821 establishments in Virginia
Populated places established in 1821
Populated places on the Roanoke River
Towns in Halifax County, Virginia
Towns in Mecklenburg County, Virginia
Towns in Virginia